The Treynor Community School District is a rural public school district headquartered in Treynor, Iowa.

The majority of the district is in Pottawattamie County, with a small area in Mills County.  It serves Treynor and the surrounding rural areas.

The school mascot is the Cardinal and the colors are red and white.

Schools
The district operates three schools, all in Treynor:
Treynor Elementary School
Treynor Middle School
Treynor High School

Treynor High School

Athletics
The Cardinals compete in the Western Iowa Conference in the following sports:
Cross Country
Volleyball
Football
2-time State Champions (1979, 2003)
Basketball
 Boys' 2015 Class 2A State Champions
 Girls' 1994 Class 1A State Champions 
Wrestling
Track and Field
 Boys' 3-time State Champions (1966, 1980, 2004)
Golf
Soccer
Baseball
Softball
 2012 Class 2A State Champions

See also
List of school districts in Iowa
List of high schools in Iowa

References

External links
 Treynor Community School District

School districts in Iowa
Education in Pottawattamie County, Iowa
Education in Mills County, Iowa